Bothe-Napa Valley State Park is a state park of California in the United States. Located in the Napa Valley, it contains the farthest inland coast redwoods in a California state park.  The  park was established in 1960.

In 2011 during the California budget crisis, this park and the adjacent Bale Grist Mill State Historic Park were among those targeted to be closed due to lack of funding.  The Napa County Parks and Open Space District petitioned the state to operate the park in order to avoid closure.

History
The park property was originally part of the Rancho Carne Humana Mexican land grant.

See also
 List of California state parks

References

External links
Bothe-Napa Valley State Park–California State Parks
Bothe-Napa Valley State Park–Napa Valley State Parks Association

1960 establishments in California
Parks in Napa County, California
Parks in Sonoma County, California
Protected areas established in 1960
State parks of California
St. Helena, California
Bay Area Ridge Trail